Milna is a rural locality (a village) in Ilkinskoye Rural Settlement, Melenkovsky District, Vladimir Oblast, Russia. The population was 55 as of 2010. There are 2 streets.

Geography 
Milna is located 21 km south of Melenki (the district's administrative centre) by road. Kudrino is the nearest rural locality.

References 

Rural localities in Melenkovsky District